The All-American Girls Professional Baseball League (AAGPBL) was a women's professional baseball circuit which existed for twelve seasons from  through .

For the first three seasons the league did not have an official All-Star team. Nevertheless, on July 1, 1943, took effect the first All-Star Game of the league, which coincidentally became the first night game ever played at Wrigley Field. The contest was played under temporary lights between two teams composed of Racine Belles and Kenosha Comets players against South Bend Blue Sox and Rockford Peaches players. At the end of the inaugural season the league selected an All-Star team composed of fifteen players. Currently there are no records available to indicate that an All-Star team was recognized during the 1944 and 1945 seasons.

Starting in 1946, the team's managers of the league selected a squad of All-Star players as a result of individual achievements and performances during the regular season. In the voting, more than a hundred players received some recognition in nine successive seasons and the All-Star Team would play against the club with the best record in an exhibition game.

1943

1944-1945
 No All-Star teams

1946

1947

1948

1949

1950

1951

1952

1953

1954

Sources

All-American Girls Professional Baseball League
1943 establishments in the United States
1954 disestablishments in the United States
All-star games